Shalom Hartman Institute is a Jewish research and education institute based in Jerusalem, that offers pluralistic Jewish thought and education to scholars, rabbis, educators, and Jewish community leaders in Israel and North America. The institute's goal is to strengthen Jewish peoplehood, identity and pluralism, enhance the Jewish and democratic character of Israel, and ensure that Judaism is a compelling force for good in the 21st century.

History

Rabbi Professor David Hartman founded Shalom Hartman Institute in 1971. His wife Bobbi and their five children made aliyah to Israel, leaving his congregation in Montreal. Rabbi Hartman's home in Jerusalem became a beit midrash for young people attracted to Rabbi Hartman's philosophy. By 1976, the group was moved to a local synagogue, and the Shalom Hartman Institute was born - named for the memory of Rabbi Hartman's father.

After several changes of location, Teddy Kollek, former mayor of Jerusalem and a longstanding supporter of Rabbi Hartman, offered the institute more than three acres of land in the city's "Cultural Mile" which comprises the Jerusalem Theater, the L.A. Mayer Institute for Islamic Art and other cultural and educational centers and institutes.

The institute established a variety of programs for teachers, rabbis, and lay leaders. Under Rabbi Hartman and his son, Rabbi Dr. Donniel Hartman, the institute has become a training center whose programs reach thousands of participants every year. Rabbi Dov Gartenberg of Los Angeles wrote in his blog in 2005 that the institute, "enables us to reflect on cutting edge issues facing modern Judaism." In 2009, Donniel Hartman was named president of Shalom Hartman Institute, and David Hartman was named founding president. In 2010 the Shalom Hartman Institute was called "prestigious" by a website covering San Francisco Bay Area Jewish affairs.

Shalom Hartman Institute's campus houses an advanced research center, provides a home to more than 50 scholars, including Israel Knohl, Moshe Idel, Menachem Lorberbaum, and others. The campus is also home to Charles E. Smith High School for Boys, grades 7–12, with more than 350 students, an in-house publications department that is publishing a series of books on Jewish thought with UK-based publisher Continuum International Publishing Group, conducts an annual conference, and centers for training educators, rabbis and lay community leaders.

The Shalom Hartman Institute is the organizer of the Muslim Leadership Initiative, which invites North American Muslims to explore how Jews understand Judaism, Israel, and Jewish peoplehood. The program also encourages participants to experience how Israelis, both inside and outside Israel, identify themselves, while exploring the issues of ethics, faith, and practice.

In May 2010, Israel's opposition party leader Tzipi Livni of Kadima called upon the Hartman Institute to organize the speakers for a daylong conference at the Israeli Knesset on Jewish identity in Israel.

Organizational structure
Shalom Hartman Institute is structured around four centers and a board of directors.

David Hartman Center for Intellectual Leadership
The David Hartman Center for Intellectual Leadership trains and cultivates the next generation of committed intellectual leaders capable of generating a renaissance in Jewish life through their innovative ideas and applied scholarship. The center will eventually offer a comprehensive spectrum of programs aimed at accompanying unique individuals from the beginning of their graduate studies through the first stages of their post-doctoral work.

Kogod Research Center for Contemporary Jewish Thought
The Kogod Research Center for Contemporary Jewish Thought is a think tank developing new ideas about Jewish life. Scholars and educators discuss pluralistic Jewish thought for the 21st century. Past participants in programs include Krister Stendahl and Michael Walzer. Areas of research include ethics, politics and public policy, halakha, gender, Judaism in Israel, world Jewry, religion and religiosity, Jewish classics.

Center for Israeli-Jewish Identity
The Center for Israeli-Jewish Identity focuses on pluralistic forms of contemporary Judaism for Israelis, from non-religious high school students to senior officers in the IDF. The Education Center's aim is to help Israelis learn about their Jewish heritage. The Be'eri Initiative for Pluralistic Jewish Education works with more than 50 Israeli high schools, hundreds of teachers and thousands of students. The Avi Chai Foundation, one of the Be'eri program's original funders says: "the project has had a significant positive influence on student attitudes to Jewish studies."

Shalom Hartman Institute-North America
The goal of the Shalom Hartman Institute-North America, run by its president Yehuda Kurtzer, is to strengthen Jewish communities in North America. SHI North America runs programs and seminars across the US and Canada.

The Institute runs a three-year program for North American rabbis that one participant described as: "one of the blessings of my rabbinate."

In July 2012, the Shalom Hartman Institute began a partnership with Hillel: The Foundation for Jewish Life on Campus, called the Fellowship for Campus Professionals. The program brings Hartman Fellows to campuses in America in order to discuss and teach about the Jewish relationship with Israel.

In August, Hartman runs an annual student leadership summit; students, who are nominated by their university, gather to discuss issues, such as how to become a leader in one's Jewish community on campus.

Board, funders, and supporters
Shalom Hartman Institute board members (2014–2015) include, Robert P. Kogod, chair, Shalom Hartman Institute, Angelica Berrie, Chair, SHI-North America.

Shalom Hartman Institute-North America is a non-profit organization with a 501.3c charitable status for accepting donations. Canadian Friends of Shalom Hartman Institute is a registered Canadian charity and is located in Montreal.

References

External links
 Hartman Institute Official Website
 Videos of lectures at Shalom Hartman Institute

Jewish theology
Research institutes in Israel
Jewish educational organizations
Jews and Judaism and pluralism
Jews and Judaism in Jerusalem
Research institutes established in 1976
Organizations based in Jerusalem